Tajpur is a village in Zamania tehsil of Ghazipur District, Uttar Pradesh, India. It was a part of Daudpur (Dewaitha) but later it was separated.

References

Villages in Ghazipur district